Drenaje Profundo is a primetime television series produced by TV Azteca. It stars Ana Serradilla, Rodrigo Murray, Juan Pablo Medina and Elizabeth Cervantes. The series began in October 2010.

Plot
After an accident in the Mexico City subway system, the detective Ulises Elizalde (Juan Pablo Medina) is sent to investigate.  Ulises follows after a man who punches him on the subway tracks and he accidentally falls into the sewers.  Underground  he is rescued by Yamel (Ana Serradilla) a young woman who's hiding an enormous secret.  It's later revealed that Yamel, and the other people living in the sewer drain have been injected with an eternal youth serum that was developed by a scientist named Igor, under the orders of Milosz, an evil scientist from the late sixties. That's the reason why Yamel, who in actuality is 65 years old, has the appearance of a 25-year-old woman.

Cast

International broadcast
 Azteca Guatemala
 Azteca America
 Astro Bella

References

Azteca 7 original programming
Mexican drama television series
Television series by TV Azteca